Owen Davies (1914 – 13 September 1978) was a West Indian cricket umpire. He stood in three Test matches between 1962 and 1965.

Davies was born in Wales, and served in the Royal Air Force in the Second World War. After the war he moved to Jamaica, where he spent the last 30 years of his life. He worked enthusiastically to promote cricket and cricket umpiring in Jamaica's rural areas, and was a member of the Jamaica Cricket Board of Control for some years. He umpired ten first-class matches in Jamaica, including three Tests, between 1954 and 1967. He was murdered by gunmen while sitting at home in St. Mary, Jamaica.

See also
 List of Test cricket umpires
 Indian cricket team in West Indies in 1961–62
 Australian cricket team in West Indies in 1964–65

References

1914 births
1978 deaths
West Indian Test cricket umpires
Royal Air Force personnel of World War II
People murdered in Jamaica
Jamaican cricket administrators